Relay Bay is an arm of Robertson Bay, about 5 nautical miles (9 km) wide, lying between Islands Point and Penelope Point along the north coast of Victoria Land. It was first visited on October 4, 1911 by the Northern Party, led by Victor Campbell, of the British Antarctic Expedition, 1910–13; the bay is so-named because the party found it necessary to relay their sledges owing to the heavy pressure ridges encountered here. The Nielsen, Ommanney, Crume and Reusch Glaciers flowing into the bay contribute to these pressures.

Bays of Victoria Land
Pennell Coast